The Union of Central African Workers, created in 1964, is a trade union centre in the Central African Republic. It was formed by the merger of the African Confederation of Free Trade Unions-Workers Force-Central African Republic, African Confederation of Believing Workers - Central African Republic, African General Confederation of Labour-Central African Republic and the FECETEC. In 1981, its activity was suspended by David Dacko's government. In place of it government-backed Confederation of Central African Workers was established, which didn't stand up for the rights of workers in practice.

It is affiliated with the International Trade Union Confederation.

References

Trade unions in the Central African Republic
International Trade Union Confederation
Trade unions established in 1964